The QF 4.7 inch Gun Mark VIII was a British naval anti-aircraft gun designed in the 1920s for the Royal Navy. This was the largest caliber fixed ammunition gun ever in service in the RN, though the round was considerably shorter and lighter than the round for the QF 4.5-inch Mk I – V naval gun. It was carried in powered HA XII mountings on the two s, two of the three s, the minelayer HMS Adventure, and the Australian seaplane tender HMAS Albatross.

See also
 List of naval anti-aircraft guns

Weapons of comparable role, performance and era
 Type 10 120 mm AA Gun: Japanese equivalent

Notes and references

Bibliography

External links

 

Naval guns of the United Kingdom
120 mm artillery
Naval anti-aircraft guns
World War II naval weapons of the United Kingdom
Military equipment introduced in the 1920s